Marino Golinelli (11 October 1920 – 19 February 2022) was an Italian art collector, businessman, and philanthropist. He was honored with the Order of Merit for Labour (1979). Golinelli was also a winner of the Golden Neptune Award (2010).

Golinelli died on 19 February 2022, at the age of 101.

References 

1920 births
2022 deaths
Italian businesspeople
Italian philanthropists
Italian art collectors
Italian centenarians
Men centenarians
University of Bologna alumni
Recipients of the Order of Merit for Labour
People from the Province of Modena